Russian Embassy School in Seoul is a Russian international school in Seosomun-ro, Jung-gu, Seoul, South Korea. It was created as of May 31, 2002 as a part of the Russian Ministry of Foreign Affairs. It serves up to secondary school.

References

External links

 Russian Embassy School in Seoul 

International schools in Seoul
Russian international schools
Educational institutions established in 2002
Russian diaspora in Asia
2002 establishments in South Korea
Jung District, Seoul